Yam Kim-fai (4 February 1913 (Lunar 29 December 1912 – 29 November 1989), also known as Ren Jianhui was a renowned Cantonese opera actress in China and Hong Kong.

Yam was most notable for her unique ability to sing in the lower register. That her opera voice was indistinguishable from a male one allowed her to play either male or female roles, though she usually performed male ones.

On 24 June 1972, Yam performed for the last time in public and TV viewers looked for the "man" they knew from movies/stage performances. They did not expect to see her in a 2-piece set of jacket and qipao (cheongsam) with floral print. Since 1972, Yam enjoyed singing in private with a live band and was often accompanied by her protégée Loong who would read the lyrics out for her until her eyesight improved with surgery.

On 11 July 1976, during the 25th Miss Universe pageant held at the Lee Theatre in Hong Kong, contestants were asked to pick from five portraits the one they thought was the actress in a male Cantonese opera costume. Yam was not the one correctly identified by any of the contestants.

In 1989, she died at home in Hong Kong due to pleural effusion. There was no JTWROS. Yam had a will drawn up and left her estate to families, including Yam Bing Yee.

Early life
Born Yam Lee Chor (Chinese: 任麗初), Yam performed as a pastime with a Cantonese opera troupe since when still in grade school. When Yam was 14, her aunt, another Cantonese opera actress, taught Yam the foundation courses. Very soon, Yam quit school and began her formal opera performance studies with Wong Lui Hap, who was known for being the female version of Ma Sze Tsang but became known more often as Sifu of Yam (Chinese: 高 徒 出名 師). After the Second Sino-Japanese War, Wong worked with Luo Pinchao in Hong Kong at some point. Although they never co-operated again once the formal contract expired, Yam provided for Wong, a working poor in modern language, who was not well-off late in life (Chinese: 生 養 死 葬).

Rooftops in Guangdong
Jade Flower (Chinese: 玉瓊花) was one of the first female leads to co-star on stage. Yam earned her place, rising to prominence and eventually becoming a male lead at the age of 17, but switching between being male lead and playing second fiddle to Wong or other actresses such as Chan Pei Mui (陳皮梅), who were more experienced and well-known, for another few years before venturing out on her own as male lead in many all-female troupes (小飛紅-太平艷影劇團/譚蘭卿-梅花影劇團) in "rooftop theatres".

Rooftop theatres were for all-female troupes since the time of Lee Suet Fong (李雪芳) who formed the all-female troupe (「群芳艷影」) which she left when married in 1923. Lee basically set a bar for all female leads that only Fong Yim Fun had come close in a century. (Fong, a female lead since 16, performed with Lee at some point, was inspired and created her own vocal style from just sharing the stage.) Since the first top four all-female troupes, female leads became less noteworthy as the actresses in male lead roles. Male and female performers were not often in same troupe until after Japan took Guangdong. The reputation of an all-female troupe was  inferior to that of an all-male troupe. Yam observed that male leads were called sissies in the street while the jingles below  reflected the sentiment about those troupes.
《鄉下佬買戲》：「講到鰟鱓女班經已做到怕，有文無武而且有鱓仲老過我阿媽。」
香港報章：「女優薪金微賤，當可以減班主之負擔。」

Yam took after a male performer to be no "sissy", by just being in the audience, and became known as the female version of Kwai Ming Yeung, both AAA and vocal, before 1933, the year Ma Sze Tsang hired Tam Lan Hing to perform with him in Hong Kong.

Theatres in Macau
Many troupes with male performers followed her first own (Chinese:「鏡花影女劇團」, 1935-1942) with Tsui Yan Sam as co-star not long since Yam was initially hired to perform in a temporary theatre (collapsed after 5 days) built in greyhound racing stadium. (Now known as Canidrome, was special to Yam who attended the grand opening in 1963 with Loong, Pak Yin and others.) Co-stars also included other actresses at times as and when Yam saw fit. Co-stars had always been replaceable to her. One walked out the door, another one (but two for Loong in 2013) would be in her arms already. Yam had quite a fan base of mostly married ladies right out of the gate, including the wife of Mr. Bat1 Leoi5 Gim6 who hired Yam to perform in 1935. Theatres in Macau her all-female troupe performed included the Ching Ping Theatre at Travessa do Auto Novo. To reflect her respect when Chan Pei Mui with sister Chan Pei Aap joined her, Yam renamed her troupe ("梅"花艷影劇團) in deference to her former boss who also shared male lead status with Yam in this troupe. The three of them offered the female version of Kwai Ming Yeung (Yam), Sit Gok Sin (Mui) and Ma Sze Tsang (Aap), Tsui Yan Sam (徐人心) as female lead, and kept building up an even stronger fan base on what Yam already accumulated in Macau.

Portugal owned Macau during the Second World War and it was neutral during the conflict. Japan's respect for that neutrality made Macau a safe haven for migration from elsewhere otherwise occupied by Japan. Population in Macau went up significantly as a result. Their support for performances made life relatively easy for performers.

(Depending on individual performer's pay grade, some were paid in a less volatile currency. The top-billed (female lead) Tam Lan Hing, arrived in Macau in late 1942 and eventually gained weight in those years, was rumored to get one tael of gold for a day of performance.)

Ma Sze Tsang formed the first Hong Kong troupe with both actors and actresses in 1933. Records show Yam's all-female troupe was the last one still doing well in theatres since then. For ten years (1935-1945), Yam made Macau her home, when her hometown in Guangdong fell to the Japanese during the Second Sino-Japanese War. Meanwhile, she moved her family, including her (Chinese custom, actually paternal first cousins.) younger sister Yam Bing-yee into her new home in Macau. Occasionally, Yam in 1939 renamed that same all-female opera troupe (「鏡花艷影劇團」/高陞戲院/紫雲霞/《夜出虎狼關》郎紫峯=郎筠玉) to perform in Hong Kong or in 1942 travelled to perform in Guangdong with Hung Sin Nui's Sifu (何芙蓮) as the co-star. Hung met Yam that year.

In Macau, she met the major contributors to her career, two very important men and a married couple through the two brothers who eventually became the troupe manager and librettist. One man became her godfather and vocal style tutor while the other man helped manage her finance and held the purse strings at times, looking after the war chest Yam built up in Macau.

Theatres in Hong Kong
Yam was the male lead in many Cantonese opera stage productions, in Macau initially and in Hong Kong since 1945, opposite many actresses, including Sheung Hoi Mui (上海妹), Che Sau Ying (車秀英), Tam Lan Hing (譚蘭卿) and Tang Pik Wan (鄧碧雲). With the 1942/3 financial help from Mr. Ho Yin, father of Edmund Ho, she formed a new opera troupe called New Voice Opera Troupe (「新聲劇團」) with manager (徐時), librettists (徐若呆/歐陽儉) and the following performers who joined the troupe one at a time:-

 Chan Yim Nung (陳艷儂), the Daan (Chinese: 旦)
 Au Yeung Kim (歐陽儉), the Cau (Chinese: 丑)
 Lang Chi Bak (靚次伯), the Zing (Chinese: 淨)
 Yam Bing Yee (任冰兒)
 Bak Sheut Sin (白雪仙)

Dream of Red Chamber in Macau was one of many highlights in her career since being the last all-female troupe standing. The trend of huge production cost never recoverable from no matter how good box-office record as a result also caused Yam headache.

Yam was known since very young as the single financial source of immediate family, extended families, big spender co-star and associated families. Yam had a reputation of being very generous, footing the bills when her troupe was in trouble. Chan Lap Ban told in 1989 on camera the old days when they performed in villages (both age 20 or so). Investors failed to pay for their performance. Yam as the patriarch actually provided for the troupe to be all home safe, with her personal gold collection.

Since leaving Macau, there was no more Macau financing but the spending spree continued.  A "too good to be just student" of Tang allowing the free use of his story-on-air saved Yam/Lang/Au Yeung from ("大包細") financial ruin, same daily pay for five of the six pillars, ignoring the gigantic gap in pay (market) grade among them. (Said to be HK$200 per day of performance while ticket price was HK$6 only.) That's the back to grass-root, getting off the high horse, episode before New Voice Opera Troupe ceased to exist. Spending spree so resulted made it necessary for Yam to rely heavily on film roles for income and a real estate portfolio properly managed by reliable personnel.

Yam's The Marriage of Tang Bohu, renamed in 1974 as The Marriage of Three Smiles (三笑姻緣), came to the rescue in 1956 when the Tang flub started on day one, let alone no more than 6 rows of audience in 1956 the world was never informed.  The flubbing of Tang continued until the 1957 Di Nü Hua in which Yam as male lead played the more important role in Tang's work for the first time. However, that ended after The Purple Hairpin. They are the only two films among Tang's BIG FOUR which Tang had the opportunity to bask in the glory before he died. Cinematographic plans to bring titles to cinemas before these two were cancelled as a result of very bad receptions. The movie rights of other BIG FOUR titles never came up until decades later. This is the second ruin that lasted six long years. What Yam earned by chance encounter (見獵心起) in the process was a successor she treasured for close to 30 years.

The third major financial disaster was rescued with her extremely exhausting 1968 North America tour, more than a decade since she was deprived of the chance to say goodbye to her dying mother, the most treasured family member. Yam paid for the four-year long production of a film in Cantonese. The cost is said to be somewhere between that of two films directed by Li Han-hsiang. The Magnificent Concubine (1962 film) was the first Chinese-language film (楊貴妃 (1962年電影)) to win the Grand Prix for Best Interior Photography and Color. The Empress Wu Tse-Tien was also entered into the 1963 Cannes Film Festival.
However, this 1968 film has never reached anywhere beyond Hong Kong and was screened in cinemas only a few times for the five decades since released. Loong's stage production in 1982 provided a path that the storyline was introduced to Las Vegas and beyond. This 1982 stage version is also regularly put on stage by later generations of Cantonese opera performers.

Career
A performer on stage first and foremost, Yam was the male lead in many Cantonese opera stage productions in Hong Kong, post-war, opposite many actresses, including but not limited to Chan Yim Nung, Yu Lai Zhen, Fong Yim Fun, Tang Pik Wan, Hung Sin Nui.

Many of her performances were made into films, such as the 1953 remake of Sweet Girl.

1. Fong Yim Fun since Golden Phoenix Opera Troupe (Chinese: 芳艷芬, 金鳳屏劇團) - top-billed instead of Yam sometimes. Many titles were adapted for the screen, a few iconic ones are listed below. Yam is in Qing Dynasty attire including pao, mao (a stiff cap) and magua (a buttoned mandarin jacket 'for the rich') for the first two below, both set in late 1800s and early 1900s.

2. Yu Lai Zhen (Chinese: 余麗珍) - many movies were made from stage productions. For example, 1960 film Golden Chrysanthemum (Chinese: 《血洗梅花澗》/《七彩金葉菊》) and 1951 film A King Speaks His Heart (《帝苑春心化杜鵑》) with both Sit Gok Sin and Ma Sze Tsang as well.

3. Chan Yim Nung (陳艷儂) - the Dream of the Red Chamber (《紅樓夢》), Red Chamber in the Sea (《海角紅樓》)

4. Tang Pik Wan (鄧碧雲) - In Macau Wife in the morning, sister-in-law at night (《晨妻暮嫂》). Many movies (1947, 1952 and 1957 My wife married my brother) were made from this stage production. For example, 1956 film Guizhi Sues from the title The Daughter of the Horse Trader or Kwaichi sues (《販馬記》/《桂枝告狀》) which was Yam's debut but not Tang's.

5. Hung Sin Nui (紅線女) - vocal records like Kingdom and the Beauty or Prince and the Waitress (《游龍戲鳳》1953) were made from those plays. Stage production at Wing Lok Theatre (《胭脂虎棒打紫薇郎》,《女媧煉石補青天》) was, for example, in Hong Kong, early 1950s. Ngor Jie selling dumplings (《娥姐賣粉果》) in June 1952 was the last time shared stage.

These actresses above are successful performers in their own right. They shared the stage with as well as had film roles opposite many male leads throughout their career. Tang Pik Wan actually took on male lead roles as well while Chan Yim Nung did that in late 1950s as well as much later in life in United States for leisure.

Films
In movies from 1951 to 1968, Yam played the male lead opposite just about every female lead, young like daughter of Leung Sing Bor included. In the 1961 film, "Fun on Polygamous Marriage"  (《八美審狀元》), Yam is married to eight wives; Yu Lai Zhen (余麗珍), comedian Tam Lan Hing (譚蘭卿, 1908-1981) and Yam Bing Yee (任冰兒) are three of the actresses opposite Yam in it as the wives. However, her first film was "A Mysterious Night" in 1937 after observing film-making as a friend of Luo Pinchao and others. Good proportion of the 300 movies she made are contemporary, neither in Cantonese opera costumes nor set in early 1900s when women still had bound feet.

The above actresses are all very versatile and successful on stage as well as in films and TV (late in life). Fong Yin Fun, Yu Lai Zhen and Ng Kwun Lai all owned film production companies and hired Yam often by choice and therefore top-billed instead of Yam sometimes. Law Yim Hing and Ng Kwun Lai seldom shared the stage with Yam but made many films with her. Four of the seven listed (Fong Yin Fun, Law Yim Hing, Fung Wong Nui and Tang Pik Wan) dressed in male costume on stage as well as in films at some point. The 1956 film How Wong Fei-hung Saved the Lovelorn Monk from the Ancient Monastery reflects how wide the range of films Yam was in.

Linchpin
Yam was the "speak softly and carry a big stick" member of Cantonese opera community but without cult of personality character. Entourage (hospital, airport, etc.) around her could become out of control if she allowed it. (For example, construction, medical and legal professionals at a certain pay grade were not allowed to advertise out-right in the past. Getting in the limelight with celebrities was an alternative or even better deal. The resulted stream of "an upscale clientele" was worth the time and expenses.) However, the residue value of her "down-ballot effect" is minimal for her co-stars. The last two, Lam and Loong, who played second fiddle to her on stage as second leading "men" continue to be super idols for decades.

Since 1956, for four years and then only sporadically in 1960s, on stage she was limited to only work opposite Bak Sheut Sin, fifteen years her junior and green from debut only in 1953, as the abandoned woman, a character like Eliza in My Fair Lady, in Red Cherries and a Broken Heart (Chinese: 紅了櫻桃碎了心).

Between 1953 and 1956, Bak played second fiddle (flowery role 花衫) to either Fong Yim Fun or Hung Sin Nui when Yam was the male lead opposite any one of them or Chan Yim Nung before that.

They reprised many of those roles when the operas were adapted for the screen between 1951 and 1968. The only two made into movies are Li Yi (李益) in The Legend of the Purple Hairpin and Zhou Shixian (Chinese: 周世顯) in Tai Nui Fa. However, some of Yam's other roles like Liu Mengmei (Chinese: 柳夢梅) in the Cantonese opera version of The Peony Pavilion and Pei Yu (Chinese: 裴禹) in The Reincarnation of Lady Plum Blossom were never made into movies. The latter is available only in vocal record. Her Liu Mengmei (Chinese: 柳夢梅) was never recorded for commercial purpose with Bak Sheut Sin.

Farewell
The last overseas tour was 1968 in North America.
With all of her 'next' generation, in tow,
the last on stage live production of five titles in 1968/69/70 followed
the last film "Tragedy of the Poet King" released in 1968.

Last public performance was on 24 June 1972.

Yam introduced her six backup singers, her 'next' generation, to the wider audience with a song from 1964. Also, same day with Bak Sheut Sin, she sang the final scene from Tai Nui Fa for the TVB telethon event that was hosted for the victims in the 18 June landslide.

Yam never performed in public again since then. Instead, she kept her protégée close by for training and proper upbringing to be her successor.

Yam valued Loong as someone with a good head on shoulders and worth all resources needed to groom as successor to her AAA in Cantonese opera right after observing the 1965 September performances. In addition, Yam called Loong clever, subservient to her and persevering. A successor to Yam means, a frugal life off-stage and (if necessary) an only financially responsible adult in the room, in addition to:-

The short film shows the level of maturity Yam has achieved after years of struggle. With highly accomplished and superb opera acting skills, she knows how to improvise if it should become necessary. Such a stage demeanor can only be projected by a veteran virtuoso opera performer.

同場將加映《錦繡天堂》
（1964）中折子戲「孟麗君」，是任姐奮鬥多年、成熟揮灑的表演，造詣高深，演技精湛，既具壓台感，又懂得「執生」，示範了真正的大老倌的舞台風範。

Old hands eating their young in the community is the die hard old habit like mothers-in-law punishing their sons' wives in Chinese culture.  Senior members see their turn to be nasty and rip-off the young, thumbing their noses at the rank and file. With this danger in mind or not, Yam kept her time with Loong between the two of them. People are therefore naïve about the role Yam played in making Loong the success story some contemporary performers know as the prequel of their own career in Cantonese opera. Yam and Loong together had more than leveled the playing field for generations of actresses who have joined the Cantonese opera community since 1980s.

Patriarch Quality
Birds must fly far and high to start their own families. Adult birds feed the young with their vomit only till they can fly on their own. It can take weeks or months.  Patriarchs in Cantonese opera, the show-runners, must stand on their own two feet sooner or later. Sooner rather than later according to Yam, she kept in touch with Loong by long-distance phone calls only during overseas tours, even during those four months in 1975. Her trip was promised to be all paid for should she take it. She visited sometimes (in Canada per Loong) but never planted herself front and center to get the Press's attention.

By 2000 in Hong Kong, Loong on camera talked about an AAA formula. (She shared same or another one with lads in recent years. Their digestive systems were not ready yet, according to themselves on radio) that she learnt from Yam and applied in all her performances while in 1980s Loong was already far beyond the abc123 according to the Press. Yam's approach to acquired taste could have been to advise someone to "try cabbage compresses" instead of what happened to the wet nurse of Puyi in the 1987 film The Last Emperor.
Exhibit A of acquired taste in Hong Kong observed as per 2012-06-05 【Wen Wei Po】"就像某富豪生有五子，其中大兒子努力建立自己的事業，其餘四子只依賴父親供養。到富豪百年歸老，遺囑上只有四個兒子的名字可分家產，大兒子卻一個巴仙也沒有分到，大兒子大罵自己是傻瓜，為甚麼不學四個弟弟做大懶蟲，享受父蔭。"

Leslie Cheung was rumored to have learnt singing from Loong in 1980s for his concert performance. There are however more open and extreme cases in that nature. One (扑/撲) could afford no more than being in the audience twice of the 28 shows (in 24 days just off the top of her head after 26 years) in 1985 before turning 20, per herself on radio in 2011. One (仆) was older than 20 when Loong performed 25 shows in 2011 and released DVD afterwards. The former (扑) has been called a copy of Loong for years although Loong disagreed when approached by the Press in 2005. (A "YES" from Loong would have been easily construed as an affirmation by the Press even though Loong was in the audience only when she (扑) was still in training school.) The latter (仆) uses his 15 minutes of fame as headline for promotion. Just 2/3 years ago, he didn't but his wife talked on radio about his "Loong video viewing" in order to prepare for his one time only big gig. These speak to the integrity (wet finger in the wind), learning habit/style and learning (in)ability of individuals as professional performers. Some (仆) are neither fish nor fowl (非驢非馬) by choice, Jack of all trades, master of none always.

However, there has been more a problem for actresses to find a female lead on stage to even meet the minimum expectation since the poor performance of the female lead in these 50+ shows are also well-documented by columnists and insiders alike since 1985. Elder/veteran in the Cantonese opera community pointed to her lack of improvement from the very low level they first saw in 1979, notwithstanding being on stage for decades non-stop, in mid-2000s on camera. They kindly blamed her busy social schedule for her being the same old rug. Lam Kar Sing didn't know what himself was really up against for close to two decades until after spending months to teach her.

A Lesson in What Not to Do

One son shared with first cousins once removed the "right" lesson to take away. Their maternal grandma was busy studying manuscript for performance. According to the son, his mother's "misspent youth", playing hooky, not paying attention in class and not studying at home, was to blame for still learning the same abc123 after 60+ years. There is actually plenty of evidence to prove in due course the grandma's successful career, lifetime effort and endurance. No harm, no foul but not vice versa. In reverse, fraudulent "role model" misrepresentations along with all evidence of the what's not to do wiped out are just to young minds "poison ivy", something only monsters feed infants and toddlers so as "to increase their growths". (Poison ivy always has clusters of three leaves.)

The motive to wipe out in 2013 was in plain sight but in vain. Live on air, one academic started reining in the clueless radio host Mr. Chan and guest (now deceased "walking encyclopedia" in Cantonese opera) who kept admiring how great box office record for decades Loong achieved on stage, especially the 2011 winter event and 2012 IFPI wins, a finalist up for a vote. The now deceased columnist and/or radio character had plenty of her mind in writing for over 50 years that wagging finger of any academic behind a microphone couldn't remove from the wall. The occasion merely marked the beginning of concerted campaign out in open to promote misaligned personal agenda. The academic launched her current career by books published in the past specifically related to Loong's return to stage.  Without Loong on board, published was add-on/attachment to a book already on the way to printer.

"Whom to learn what from" then is the most difficult question. People only see what they are prepared to see. How to learn if never see the good in other people. One privileged student of a master from her vintage point backstage observed nothing more than a female lead as born without a good voice or good look and concluded that "She only hided it well. Nice thread.". That student never played the legacy classic roles such female lead best known for. Neither was her 1956 Pan4 Hing1 (顰卿) a success to say the least. (For ten years in Macau, HK and Guangdong, strong built (big and tall) Chan pulled it off. One veteran audience was convinced by her acrobatic skill on stage as Lin Daiyu.)

As such, what did not happen was the film Dream of Red Chamber directed by Lau Hak Suen and produced by a new production company (興友影業公司), with Yam as Jia Baoyu along with:-
Lau Hak Suen
Poon Yat On
Yam Bing Yee
Pak Bik (白碧)
Fung Wong Leui
Mui Yee (梅綺, 1922 - 1966), 1956 original cast for Xue Baochai.

During Japanese occupation of Hong Kong, the said female lead let an underprivileged 10/11-year-old Lam use her official gown (蟒袍) temporarily for performance in Guangdong. Lam spent about his last breath to make sure the lad of his choice at least has one decent co-star for this Sit legacy title going forward. While jury is still out on this lad, Lam gave his blessings knowing his performance of this title planned. The lad is by design free to hire any co-star, a benefit Lam (unlike Loong) enjoyed in his career throughout.

Some individuals can learn in less orthodox settings and run with what they can take away. For example, Loong accompanying Leung Sing Bor on set of Tai Nui Fa filming in 1975 to meet fans/visitors from SE Asia was what Yuen called the best "observe, watch and learn" opportunity in the era of Sifu/apprentice system. On the contrary, wrong lessons could also be found in photographs. The ne'er-do-well was peeled off the costume cladded Loong, when group photos were taken that day in 1975. That's her day off just like several other occasions during the 1975 filming when photos were taken.  Following the tag-along playbook of some "never good in her own right", said person in 1960s actually already used Loong's thigh as armrest when Loong was wearing shorts, much to Loong's dismay.

By the same token, instead of getting autographs from Sifu/mentor or just photos by the Press with Sifu/mentor and friends on film sets, Loong was also photographed holding the make-up mirror on several occasions for her mentor and has since been known as the only student of Yam who learnt the secret manner to get ready for long hours on stage with makeups on and headache free.
 on film set for Yam to put on costume during the shooting of their 1964-7 cinematographic co-operation but Loong only had her own hair done (Loong was so busy that she didn't even get a proper photo with Yam like classmates did on set in costumes by the Press.)
 backstage in 1968/69 live productions
 home of Yam in 1975 possibly putting on costume one last time

Loong represented Yam on stage as Jia Baoyu to live audience and TVB broadcast afterwards in the 1980 gathering (省港紅伶大會串), the first since 1949, of the Who's Who (noteworthy and influential) in Cantonese opera from Guangdong and Hong Kong. Loong was also front and center off stage on behalf of Yam to greet senior members including but not limited to Hung Sin Nui, Leung Sing Bor and Ho Fei Fan. Leung and Ho both passed away within a year since the group photograph for such occasion. (Loong actually had Ho's former costume helpers on staff since mid-1970s for her SE Asia tour while Ho's only noteworthy apprentice (李揚聲) has not been active in Hong Kong. That is, Ho had no successor with him although Hung brought along one student in 1980.)

Yam took Loong under her wings just like many Cantonese opera masters did/does. Sit Gok Sin picked a young lad and groomed Lam Kar Sing who also picked a young lad very late in life. Sit and Lam both had veteran performers hanging around for decades to borrow their fame throughout their life. Rather than beating a dead horse, Sit and Lam each only spent their last six years to make sure their AAA continue to shine on stage. It has been beyond connections and history, family or otherwise. Master, growing up tough, passed the test of the Shaolin Wooden Men Alley (打木人行出身) like Yam did, knows too well what it takes.  As patriarch, the breadwinner, the successful transfer of their AAA goes hand in hand with their status for history books. Masters brand the successors' troupes in their own images to reflect their approvals. None of them wanted their names soiled in the hands of unfit but well-connected veteran performers.

Reputation is always on the line

Patriarch is always the one with his/her reputation on the line except when top-billed female leads are of the caliber of Fong (since the creation of own vocal style)/Tam (before gaining weight in Macau). It is just fantasy until the path from A to B is clear. Only wrong casting makes an incompetent director, who couldn't demonstrate and/or teach, cut & paste vocal style. That approach doesn't fit the 1980s description by Lam who didn't mind directors using his coat tail to make a name in Cantonese opera.

For example, grass-root or 爽台 is not to turn Casablanca into Scooby-Doo and Shaggy completely out of context in addition to:-
 dancing Hula
 talking brothel related STD
 naming off-stage grievance in Hong Kong and Bugis Street in Singapore - performer deceased
 pretending to relieve himself - performer deceased

Having spent close to 20 years with the original cast (died in 1964), Lam didn't want lads to learn from performer #2 above and showed them the video of another performer, Tam Ting Kwun (譚定坤). Performer #1 excels in backdoors/connections but his performance was not good enough for Cantonese Opera Young Talent Showcase at hkbarwoymt to some columnists.

As an experienced, knowledgeable and hands-on patriarch for decades, Lam laid out on radio a job prescription for directors in Cantonese opera; what/where/when/how and could/couldn't contribute. Yuen was more frank on camera in 2014 that directors were obstacles to him. To be his own domain about AAA, he picked stage over film as a teenager. Desired to tell any veteran virtuoso opera performer how and what to do is just hubris for some have never seen, let alone been in those shoes of such performers. Easy-Bake Oven in baking may have an equivalent in Cantonese opera. Cheung Wood Yau was the ready-mixed cake mix for his son, assistant director Chor Yuen in the 1956 film.

Vocal style in Cantonese opera is personal, the brand, the signature, of performers, that they decide to teach/share for a fee or otherwise. Yam shared with only Loong how to use the mouth and surrounding cavities as an instrument while others learnt to sing like Yam directly or indirectly. According to herself, Yam was a home body who needed only 3-meals a day, sleep and mahjong solitaire to make her day since retirement. Actually, she was alone often photographed guiding Loong and others or talked to her buddy Leung Sing Bor during rehearsals in 1970s or others in the troupe since his death.

Loong and crew, so used to Yam looking over their shoulders, were not natural in speaking up on film set in 1976. Eventually, Loong picked up the necessary mentality as the chief and then Lang Chi Bak slowed Loong down when classmates were behind at manuscript reading as a group. Back in 2004, Loong requested musicians to pick up their pace but in vain. Returning after 12 years, Loong was caught off guard by the prevailing melodramatic style. All that happened in front of the Press in 2004. What made the performance "stale jau4 zaa3 gwai 2" (就像隔夜油條) was caught on tape in 2005. Finally Loong could put back on stage the Yam signature style in 2015/6, without undue influence any more and working with compatible co-stars and musicians. At the same time, Loong stopped hiring performer who refused to play the designated roles. Her hands were tied by coat tails back in 1980s. A performer got away with big fat paychecks without, playing all roles designated, filling the shoes left behind by the one before him.

The Choice Made
Yam went one step further by telling her supporters to see herself in Loong when time spent with Loong came to fruition. (Loong has been widely known as a quick learner.) That's the most important ringing endorsement from a mentor/Sifu. Lam gave the lad of his choice a brand (troupe) name just like Yam gave Loong the Chor Fung Ming brand name in 1982. Fung (phoenix), since the Golden Fung Ping, has been a popular reference for more than seven decades and used by many actresses as newcomers. It is golden. Early 1980s, with her successor well established as a professional career Cantonese opera performer, Yam moved to Canada. In 1989, she died at home in Hong Kong due to pleural effusion.

The 2004 emotional reunion backstage caught on tape was the best resonance of Yam's endorsement. Mrs. Ho from Macau passed away (age 98) on 16 June 2016 but wanted no attention from Cantonese opera community. She was a well-known enthusiast just like her husband and a renowned vocalist. (Her opera voice was male.) She held Loong nose-to-nose for long minutes after the 2004 performance, Loong's return to stage after the 12-year sabbatical. Mrs. Ho continued to be in the audience as well as backstage for the next few years of Loong's performances, the 2007 homecoming as successor of Yam in particular.

In 2011, Loong mentioned an "Auntie" group who reprimanded her "must return to stage (to guard Yam's reputation)". Mrs. Ho probably knew Yam before her husband financed and then gave Yam the New Voice Opera Troupe. An "Auntie" to Loong, (何賢的三姑娘), rumored to have been in charge of Yam's funeral arrangements, definitely was not brainwashed by the "Big Leap since 1990" (認三認四認乜認七) as the neither knowledgeable nor intelligent  general public did. After more than 70 years, she knew that tag-along playbook like the back of her hand. Mr. Ho Yin was said to have taken Loong under his wings like his own brother as well. However, he didn't call himself a parent. Neither Yam nor Luo Pinchao did. That speaks to the respect all of them had for Loong's own birth parents.

Yam let Loong run free generally since day one but didn't refrain from making sure Loong learn only what's good. When Yam found too disgraceful an unwanted comparison by the Press, meant to be an insult or not, Loong never performed that one title again to put that image, a disgrace from Yam's past, out of Yam's mind. Yam was embarrassed by any association with that episode of her life in 1960s but it has always been beneath a master to throw a "hissy fit" under any circumstances. Neither has it been appropriate to speak ill of the dead in the Cantonese opera community.

Yam's reputation as Jia Baoyu since 1945 has become a myth to contemporary and future audience because of the lack of any films/videos. Cut & paste private comments to serve as evidence can never beat the unshakable proofs, although infants and toddlers cannot, the knowledgeable public can see/watch with their own eyes. Records as hard evidence can include:-
DVDs (composites speak volume)
DVD of full stage, wide shots
photographs
current stage performances

By the same token, it was pointless for Yam to clarify in 1980s that myth from 1960s disgraceful episode. The truth spoke for itself on stage in recent years. Neither did Loong need to in 2014 as insiders already called out what's obvious to their eyes and ears.

Yam allegedly declined to sing in front of members of her last birthday trip. Her legacy would have been jeopardized by such "last poor taste left in their mouths" kind of  irreparable damage to her reputation and brand. Any decent human being like Loong, with a shred of respect left for Yam in their hearts and minds, wouldn't associate such disgraceful 1960s episode with the hard earned legacy of Yam, let alone those that ate off her hand for decades.

AAA on stage
Yam shared her AAA (art, acrobatics, acting) on stage, in return for combined, no more than, HK$2.00 worth of Christmas gift in the form of a pair of nylon stockings, with more than a dozen enthusiasts, age 10 to 20, for the sake of preserving the art form of Cantonese opera as she knew it for future generations. She asked for nothing else, tangible or intangible, implicit or explicit, from them, except studying hard. Yam was never heard talking about her sacrifices (For example, September 1965 told how not put on new clothes for months. ) in paving the way for her 'next' generation or made any move for her own vanity for close to 30 years, ceding the limelight for benefit of her 'next' generation.

Moreover, Yam declined to entertain any academics' requests, whether to share her AAA in Cantonese opera with them or to be back on stage for their studies/researches. This preserved the demand (hunger) from her admirers for her 'next' generation to supply (feed) in due course.

When these female enthusiasts were good and ready, Yam shared the spotlight with them every step of the way if she was not actually the spotlight that introduced to the community these then up-and-coming performers with years of training under her guidance and with a given stage name (劍 in the middle) to match hers for four of them. (This method of naming a next generation is similar to training schools in the north for other Chinese operas such as Peking opera in the past. However, 劍 is not a registered trademark and is very popular in Cantonese opera community. Chan Kim Sing (陳劍聲) was not one of the four.)

Yam was said to be the only actress competitive in male lead role of a generation and survived when the ban on "male/female in same troupe" was lifted in 1930s. Yam's protégée Loong Kim Sang (Loong) is considered by some as the first actress in male lead role that dominated the field although she was dueling with one actor very often in 1972-1992. Yam and Loong together had more than leveled the playing field for generations of actresses who have joined the Cantonese opera community since 1980s.( The list of bona fide Cantonese opera actresses in male lead roles since 1960, excluding those up-and-coming still being tutored. One of them was known as the Singapore version of Yam since 1970s and greeted Loong's crew there in 1975. Before that, Loong was in Vietnam when Chan Kim Sing was already busy in Hong Kong working for Yuen's Sifu. Chinese New Year was main business in city center for performers. The unemployed 'why not me instead' clad in checkered jacket, with bright red socks and sweater, sat idle on a broken armchair green with envy.)

Rule of Thumb
In 1999, the 10th anniversary of passing of Yam, Loong disclosed the first time on camera, Yam's rule of thumb, "Be Natural". "2015 Talk on the Rendition of Yam Kim Fai", as just about all those have been speaking publicly since 1999, referred to this term first coined by Loong. James Wong, in his 2004 piece, also referenced Loong about Yam's style.

"Prepared but be spontaneous to keep the performance refreshing in every show, as if it were the debut (first show) even for the Nth time in the same role", a bar set by mentor Yam for Loong, resulted in close to 40 versions of each of two titles from 2005 to 2008. This requirement from mentor Yam explains the challenge for Loong to be on stage within a six-month period and provide 40 different (in some way in one or two acts out of total 6 to 8) but still GOOD interpretations without changing the show as a whole. This organic way, to hunt/harvest for the meal instead of "frozen" or "canned", was the only way acceptable to Yam and therefore set Loong apart from classmates or performers of a generation from very early days. That makes it worthwhile for those who pay for their tickets to be back every day for every show.

「養兒一百歲，長憂九十九。」She was backstage, as well as in the audience, on 20 February 1989 when Loong's troupe, Chor Fung Ming (Young Phoenix) Cantonese Opera Troupe, performed The Purple Hairpin for Tong Wah (a charity event), according to one veteran audience who kept that ticket as souvenir.

"Over years, legacy projects of mentor Yam, being staged frequently, have become a very poor quality stencil instead of a xerox with the best technology available." - according to one contemporary librettist. Loong calls herself "old school" continuing to follow Yam's teaching to a T even though, as described by the Press, already "in a league of her own".

The remaining other two of the six 1972 backup singers, since retiring as cast member (six pillar) of Chor Fung Ming, have been tutoring students of all backgrounds, including some with down syndrome for years in Hong Kong. They are wise not to brand themselves as representatives of Yam style or even compare themselves with Yam while sharing what they have learnt in the decades of Yam's guidance. Yam's (style or school of) AAA on stage has only been observed and commented on by third parties. There has been no authentic account yet since neither Yam nor Loong had published on the topic.

Contrary to some comments by columnists/academics, some of the well-known signature acrobatics happened to be unintended consequence. Yam and Loong had/have spine damage from bending forward all the time to accommodate co-stars of very short statue. In 1952 film The Twelve Beauties, height difference was close to a foot when Yam still stood fairly straight in the Fantasy of Heaven of Parting Sorrow, ending scene of Dream of the Red Chamber.

Cart Before The Horse
The "a performance did take place" ("做咗") generations of performers known, per Yuen, as feel too good about themselves (Chinese: 自我感覺過份良好), would not bother to even study the script meticulously, scripts generally agreed to have all needed information from Tang, before going on stage in roles been legendary since 1950s. Instead of preparing for the task ahead by being fluent in a classic novel, they, the bottle blonde (靠黐二代), just ask for story time to attain connotations. Once upon a time, performers were illiterate and had no access to novels or other publications so readily available today. Why would contemporary performers bother?  Story time is just another coat of garlic paint on top of layers of such garlic body-paint for a decade or so already. That is not bold (大膽) but plain hubris (斗膽) for someone who had been told-off getting involved in Loong's productions from the beginning other than as investor and to provide supports in areas like promotion and stage production techniques, no matter how accommodating Loong has been with the poor choices made in many other aspects. Were there any hostage situation, such individual is also another dark soul in Cantonese opera community with nothing but a gravy train in mind. It is also obvious not the way to heed the 2012 advice properly.

The Yam legacy titles have been instantly gratifying for generations still in infancy as a performer. As a result, they skip the essential foundation courses and perform these legendary titles en masse. Contemporary performers took in pupils within years as six-pillar member of troupes to elevate themselves to the status of guru. They have audiovisual resources from the market as well as private collection to copy/learn from or even, in return for remunerations, teach followers of their own (the let's watch the video class). Yam and Loong were never hubris and claimed teacher status at any point. In 2004/5, Loong disagreed when one reporter suggested a performer, albeit successful to some, as a copy of her.

 Yam is two generations Loong's senior and had complete control over whether Loong taking in students or not throughout the 30-year mentorship. (Lam Kar Sing, who has his own version of Jia Baoyu, is the generation in-between Yam and Loong. Lam spent last six years of his life grooming a protégé as successor almost from scratch, having seen a good match instantly in the lad. One want-to-be has been hanging around Lam for fifty years, yet never learnt the proper order of cast listing and had no place around super idols. Misspent youth.)
 Loong is one to two if not three generations more senior to any contemporary career performers, except those do not take both hands to count.
「有人辭官歸故里，」
Spin-offs or rip-offs, a dime a dozen, playing fast and loose with the Yam-Loong brand to steal their thunder do not come and go.
Recent demise of Yam's legacy titles could be the work of:-
Sponges (靠嗦) who were in the audience in 1970s to 1990s and since 2004, excluding, for example, Lam Kar Sing in the audience only as a competitor since he never on the record performed any of Yam's legacy titles since 1970s.
sponges in their audiences to watch and learn
their students, excluding those hobbyists in grade/high school classes
Scavenger (靠執) carrying water for the worst childhood Shirley Temple fantasy. Misspent youth. Never good enough to play second fiddle to Loong or last around Lam.
graduate, respectably, opined that Cantonese opera was not alive without someone like Loong around in 2009 and 2016
student not aware of gimmicks available to some (such as radio host to promote personal agenda or tag along big, deserved or not, names with cult of personality to get attention in the community) was respectably online looking to boost the box-office of Tai Nui Fa in 2015
Garlic-coated generations (靠黐)
watched Loong videos to learn in 1990s in private (宗師)
graduates from the let's watch and learn together class (二代)
watched Loong videos to learn in 2000s in private (一代)
students still in the let's watch and learn together class (二代)
watched Loong videos to learn in 2010s in private
The aroma came from a brew started a year before Loong was born and decades longer than the summation of all garlic coatings of these performers. To fool (around) again and again with this iconic image of Jia Baoyu, instead of any other version, within a five-year period can be fetish, a stunt, a con, or something else. Get in line.
「有人漏夜趕科場。」
Yam only finished grade school while Loong did not finish high school when they had roles like Jia Baoyu in 1943 and 1964 respectively. In 1964, Yam taught Loong, age 20 with one year of formal training, line by line and word by word while there is no information as to how Yam came to be in that role so well received in Macau. Neither of them ever claimed to be child prodigy. They both wrote for publications and are known most for their roles as romantic scholars, well-educated and fluent in literature. Contemporary performers benefiting from Yam-Loong perspiration take it that they can just clock in/clock out and produce what is now known as poor quality stencil and the demise of such repertoire once propped up the Cantonese opera community for five decades.

Since 2011
Since 2011, Loong (金牌), with a producer (製作人) in tow, have put some of those Yam aroma back on stage. The mythical character (金牌製作人) dreaming big to build an empire on quicksand does not exist. The votes (box-office records) they received came from the pocketbooks of new as well as veteran audiences coming from the time of Yam as well as of Loong, the two career performers.

Yam legacy titles were not as well received in 1950s as a decade since the debut. That was achieved with exposure across several media. The deal was sealed with audiences from the 1970s and 1980s known to be more educated than those from the 1950s or before in Hong Kong. This is also the group that witnessed the dueling between two leading men known as super idols who dominated the only decade or two that there was an increase in audience for Cantonese opera. They can recite line by line and verse by verse of these legacy titles of Yam. These veteran audiences are not craving for run-of-the-mill low-quality performances with famous titles. They know better than even columnists (nationwide or not) or academics (worldwide or not) who are mostly motivated or paid to be biased if not just recycle second hand information or pull it out of thin air. Accommodation for entourage, including Trojan horse (二五仔), ends at water edge as always.

Vocal style

Yam was once upon a time known as the female version of and is still one of the more famous exponent of Kwai Ming Yeung style, both AAA and vocal.

Yam demonstrated the "Kwai" trait of her AAA in film The Red Robe (1965) and on stage titles like "Wong Fei-fu's Rebellion" or "The Revolt from Huang Feihu’s Rebellion" (Chinese: 《黃飛虎反五關》) instead of the roles (as romantic scholars) she spent more time on in her 40s and later years on stage. However, the voice still rose to the occasion. In 1960 for charity, Yam performed a duet with the late Leung Sing Bor, the song called "Gaoping level" (Chinese: 《高平關取級》).

According to experience of James Wong in 1960s as backup singer for this song, Yam was louder than the four of them. They were shocked by the "little old lady" met that day.

Yam reprised her role as Liang Shanbo (Chinese: 梁山伯) more than once since the title debut. A film with Fong Yin Fun (芳艷芬) released in 1958 was followed by CD with Lee Bo Ying (李寶瑩) released in 1960s, (Chinese: 《梁祝恨史》之《樓台會》) but often nicknamed (Chinese: 《梁祝恨史》之《映紅霞》). The leads each in this title also has a solo from this title in CDs. Fong performed her solo for charity in mid-1980s on stage, almost 30 years since retirement. Several more CDs with Lee as co-star are very popular including sets just like sets with others. Yam made many CDs with many co-stars or solo since what believed to be the first one in 1937.

Naamyam (Chinese: 南音) is one particular type of songs that Yam is very respected for. Paying Nocturnal Sacrifice to Kam-Kiu related to the film released in 1954 is an example quoted when Yam's name comes up on this topic. Good portion of the 1957 film Prosperity Knocks also has such demonstration of Yam vocal style.

Reflecting the lighter/grassroots side of Yam's formal training with Wong Lui Hap (Chinese: 黃侶俠) is a duet with Au Yeung Kim. The play, co-star Chan Yim Nung, with title Siu Yuet-Pak (Chinese: 蕭月白) was very popular in Macau right after the Second Sino-Japanese War. Films by Cheung Ying and others are:-
 How Two Naughty Girls Thrice Insulted Xiao Yuebai (1952)
 The True Story of Siu Yuet-Pak (Part 1) (1955)
 The True Story of Siu Yuet-Pak (Part 2) (1955)

Yam has shared this lighter, but cleaned up, side with her protégée as well and put Loong on the map globally with just one move. In 1974, Yam and Loong in matching sweater and scarf, were in studio to record for Loong's first starring role in a film as male lead. The solo (with some Leung/Tam/Lang/Sum) scene about picking his wife-to-be became the hit theme song many now contemporary performers could even recite in reverse even though they were still a pre-teen or barely teenagers back then.

Commemoration
In recognition of the talents of four late artists, Hongkong Post issued the first series of special stamps on movie stars on 15 November 1995. This stamp set focused on Hong Kong's movie stars, saluting four stars who have left their marks on film history. Yam, in Cantonese opera costume, was featured on the HK$2.60 stamp.

For her 100th birthday, Yam Kim-fai centenary celebration at HK Film Archive

In 2013, the Cantonese Opera Legend Yam Kim Fai – Repertoire Select by librettist Tang Ti-sheng (Alias:Tong Tik Sang/Tong Dick-san). was organized by the Leisure and Cultural Services Department, Hong Kong.
 Only one actress listed in male lead role (finished hkbarwo.com training school in 1983)
 Only one, aged 60 or older performer listed, never worked for Chor Fung Ming (Young Phoenix) Cantonese Opera Troupe.

On 4 February 2016, her 103rd birthday, Google Hong Kong's homepage (Google.com.hk) Google Doodle was her illustration by Google artist Sophie Diao.

Notes

See also
 Bak Sheut Sin
 Hung Sin Nui
 Tang Pik Wan

References

External links
 
 

1913 births
1989 deaths
Cantonese opera actresses
20th-century Hong Kong actresses
People from Nanhai District
Actresses from Guangdong
20th-century Chinese actresses
20th-century Hong Kong women singers
Singers from Guangdong
Chinese film actresses
Hong Kong film actresses
Hong Kong idols